So This Is London is a 1939 British comedy film directed by Thornton Freeland and starring Robertson Hare, Alfred Drayton and George Sanders. It is adapted from the 1922 play So This Is London by Arthur Goodrich which had previously been adapted into a 1930 film. An American clashes with an Englishman over the merits of their respective countries, only to find that their children have fallen in love. It was made at Pinewood Studios by 20th Century Fox's British subsidiary.

Cast
 Robertson Hare as Henry Honeycutt
 Alfred Drayton as Lord Worthing
 George Sanders as Doctor de Reseke
 Berton Churchill as Hiram Draper
 Fay Compton as Lady Worthing
 Carla Lehmann as Elinor Draper
 Stewart Granger as Laurence
 Lily Cahill as Mrs. Draper
 Mavis Clair as Mrs. Honeycutt
 Ethel Revnell as Dodie
 Gracie West as Liz

Critical reception
TV Guide gave the film two out of four stars, and commented, "(Mavis) Clair, in a minor role, gets in a few laughs as a sleepwalker."

References

Bibliography
 Low, Rachael. History of the British Film: Filmmaking in 1930s Britain. George Allen & Unwin, 1985 .

External links

Review of film at Variety

1939 films
1939 comedy films
British comedy films
Films directed by Thornton Freeland
Films shot at Pinewood Studios
British films based on plays
Films set in London
Films set in England
British black-and-white films
1930s English-language films
1930s British films